Evening of Roses, also released as Night Rose, is a 2009 Chinese film by Hong Kong director Ng See-yuen. It was adapted from a novel from Taiwanese writer Pi Zhi Cai. The film was given the official English title Night Rose.

Evening of Roses is set and was filmed in Beijing, China. It uses Digital cinematography. It is Ma Tian Yu's debut film.

Plot
A man named Ke Zhi Hong (Wallace Chung) moves into a new apartment. His initially horny landlord, whose Chinese name sounds similar to the words for "Evening Rose", Ye Mei Gui (Ruby Lin), lets him rent one room of the apartment because her dog likes him. She reminds him of his dream girl from his university years, who was his senior by one year and taught him to dance the Jewish dance "Evening Rose".

He gradually falls in love with his landlord, but he continues to dwell on his memories of the past "Evening Rose". In the end, he realizes that he remembers the past "Evening Rose" because the name "Evening Rose" reminds him of the feeling of love, and he falls into the arms of the present "Evening Rose".

Release
Evening of Roses first screened on February 14, 2009. It was limited-market release for Valentine's Day. It opened nationally in China on March 6.

Cast
 Ruby Lin as Ye Meigui
 Wallace Chung as Ke Zhihong
 Ma Tianyu as Lan Heyan
 Ni Hongjie
 Jia Nailiang

External links
  
  Evening of Roses Ebook
  Night Rose Intro
 

2009 films
2000s Mandarin-language films
2009 romance films
Films set in Beijing
Chinese romance films